Stratheden is a locality in the Richmond Valley, New South Wales, Australia. It is west of the Richmond River, approximately midway between Casino and Kyogle.

Towns in New South Wales
Northern Rivers
Richmond Valley Council